Hash oil or cannabis oil is an oleoresin obtained by the extraction of cannabis or hashish. It is a cannabis concentrate containing many of its resins and terpenes – in particular, tetrahydrocannabinol (THC), cannabidiol (CBD), and other cannabinoids. Hash oil is usually consumed by smoking, vaporizing or eating. Preparations of hash oil may be solid or colloidal depending on both production method and temperature and are usually identified by their appearance or characteristics. Color most commonly ranges from transparent golden or light brown, to tan or black. There are various extraction methods, most involving a solvent, such as butane or ethanol.

Hash oil is an extracted cannabis product that may use any part of the plant, with minimal or no residual solvent. It is generally thought to be indistinct from traditional hashish, according to the 1961 UN Single Convention on Narcotic Drugs (Schedule I and IV), as it is "the separated resin, whether crude or purified, obtained from the cannabis plant".

Hash oil may be sold in cartridges used with pen vaporizers. Cannabis retailers in California have reported about 40% of their sales are from cannabis oils.

Composition 
The tetrahydrocannabinol (THC) content of hash oil varies tremendously, since the manufacturers use a varying assortment of marijuana plants and preparation techniques. Dealers sometimes cut hash oils with other oils. The form of the extract varies depending on the extraction process used; it may be liquid, a clear amber solid (called “shatter"), a sticky semisolid substance (called "wax"), or a brittle honeycombed solid (called "honeycomb wax").

Hash oil seized in the 1970s had a THC content ranging from 10% to 30%. The oil available on the U.S. West Coast in 1974 averaged about 15% THC. Samples seized across the United States by the Drug Enforcement Administration over an 18-year period (1980–1997) showed that THC content in hashish and hashish oil averaging 12.9% and 17.4%, respectively, did not show an increase over time. The highest THC concentrations measured were 52.9% in hashish and 47.0% in hash oil.  Hash oils in use in the 2010s had THC concentrations as high as 90% and other products achieving higher concentrations  Following an outbreak of vaping related pulmonary illnesses and deaths in 2019 NBC News conducted tests on different black market THC vape cartridges and found cartridges containing up to 30% Vitamin E acetate and trace amounts of fungicides and pesticides that may be harmful.

The following compounds were found in naphtha extracts of Bedrocan Dutch medical cannabis:
 Cannabinoids: THC (~ 30%) and THCA (~ 60%).
 Monoterpenes (~ 5%): β-pinene, myrcene, β-phellandrene, cis-ocimene, terpinolene, and terpineol.
 Sesquiterpenes (~ 5%): β-caryophyllene, humulene, δ-guaiene, γ-cadinene, eudesma-3,7(11)-diene, and elemene.

History

Discovery and development
The hash oils made in the nineteenth century were made from hand collected hashish called charas and kief. The term hash oil was hashish that had been dissolved or infused into a vegetable oil for use in preparing foods for oral administration. Efforts to isolate the active ingredient in cannabis were well documented in the nineteenth century, and cannabis extracts and tinctures of cannabis were included in the British Pharmacopoeia and the United States Pharmacopoeia. These solvent extracts were termed cannabin (1845), cannabindon, cannabinine, crude cannabinol and cannabinol.

Modern usage
So called "butane honey oil" was available briefly in the 1970s. This product was made in Kabul, Afghanistan, and smuggled into the United States by The Brotherhood of Eternal Love. Production is thought to have ceased when the facility was destroyed in an explosion.

Traditional ice-water separated hashish production utilizes water and filter bags to separate plant material from resin, though this method still leaves much residual plant matter and is therefore poorly suited for full vaporization. Gold described the use of alcohol and activated charcoal in honey oil production by 1989, and Michael Starks further detailed procedures and various solvents by 1990.

Large cannabis vaporizers gained popularity in the twentieth century for their ability to vaporize the cannabinoids in cannabis and extracts without burning plant material, using temperature controlled vaporization.
Colorado and Washington began licensing hash oil extraction operations in 2014.
Small portable vape pens saw a dramatic increase in popularity in 2017.

Use 

Hash oil is consumed usually by ingestion, smoking or vaporization.

Dabbing
Smoking or vaporizing hash oil is known colloquially as "dabbing", from the English verb to daub (Dutch dabben, French dauber), "to smear with something adhesive". Dabbing devices include special kinds of water pipes ("oil rigs"), vaporizers and vape pens similar in design to electronic cigarettes.  Oil rigs include a glass water pipe and a quartz bucket which is often covered with a glass bubble or directional cap to direct the airflow and disperse the oil amongst the hot areas of the quartz "nail" (A nail is also referred to as a banger).  The pipe is often heated with a butane blowtorch rather than a cigarette lighter.

The oil can also be sold in prefilled atomizer cartridges. The cartridge is used by connecting it to a battery and inhaling the vaporized oil from the cartridge's mouthpiece.

Production

Solvent-derived/hydrocarbon extracts 
Hash oil is produced by solvent extraction (maceration, infusion or percolation) of marijuana or hashish. After filtering and evaporating the solvent, a sticky resinous liquid with a strong herbal odor (remarkably different from the odor of hemp) remains.

Fresh, undried plant material is less suited for hash oil production, because much THC and CBD will be present in their carboxylic acid forms (THCA and CBDA), which may not be highly soluble in some solvents. The acids are decarboxylated during drying and heating (smoking).

A wide variety of solvents can be used for extraction, such as chloroform, dichloromethane, petroleum ether, naphtha, benzene, butane, methanol, ethanol, isopropanol, and olive oil. Currently, resinoids are often obtained by extraction with supercritical carbon dioxide. The alcohols extract undesirable water-soluble substances such as chlorophyll and sugars (which can be removed later by washing with water). Non-polar solvents such as benzene, chloroform and petroleum ether will not extract the water-soluble constituents of marijuana or hashish while still producing hash oil. In general, non-polar cannabis extracts taste much better than polar extracts. Alkali washing further improves the odor and taste.

The oil may be further refined by 1) alkali washing, or removing the heavy aromatic carboxylic acids with antibiotic properties, which may cause heartburn, gallbladder and pancreas irritation, and resistance to hemp antibiotics; 2) conversion of CBD to THC. Process 1) consists of dissolving the oil in a non-polar solvent such as petroleum ether, repeatedly washing (saponifying) with a base such as sodium carbonate solution until the yellow residue disappears from the watery phase, decanting, and washing with water to remove the base and the saponified components (and evaporating the solvents). This process reduces the oil yield, but the resulting oil is less acidic, more easily digestible and much more potent (almost pure THC). Process 2) consists of dissolving the oil in a suitable solvent such as absolute ethanol containing 0.05% hydrochloric acid, and boiling the mixture for 2 hours.

The majority of ready to consume extract products are produced via "Closed Loop Systems.". These systems typically entail: a vessel that holds the solvent, material columns to hold the plant material, a flow meter to measure the volume of solvent entering the plant material, a recovery vessel(where heat is applied via an external jacket) to convert the liquid solvent into a vapor and separate it from the THC, CBD, or other cannabinoids/byproducts, and some form of a heat exchanger to then convert the hydrocarbon vapors back into a liquid form prior to returning to the original vessel.

One pound of marijuana yields from 1/5 to 1/10 of a pound of hash oil. The oil may retain considerable residual solvent: oil extracted with longer-chain volatile hydrocarbons (such as naphtha) is less viscous (thinner) than oil extracted with short-chain hydrocarbons (such as butane).

Colored impurities from the oil can be removed by adding activated charcoal to about one third to one half the weight or volume of the solvent containing the dissolved oil, mixing well, filtering, and evaporating the solvent. When decolorizing fatty oils, oil retention can be up to 50 wt % on bleaching earths and nearly 100 wt % on activated charcoal. The many different textures/types of hydrocarbon extracts include:

 shatter (solid, breaks easily, glass like oil)
 pull and snap (solid, bendable, but still breakable, taffy-like oil)
 diamonds/live resin (rock hard THCA isolated diamonds drenched in terpene sauce)
 crumble (solid oil that will break into small crumbs)
 budder/wax (soft, pliable, peanut butter-like consistency)

Solventless extracts: Hash rosin 

Hash rosin has recently become a top quality, highly prized product in the cannabis market. For dabbing, it is considered to be the cleanest form of concentrating cannabis, as it requires only ice, water (instead of chemical solvents like butane), heat, pressure, and collection tools. Cannabis flower material is washed with ice water, and strained using filters in sequential micron size to isolate intact trichomes and their heads into ice water hash. The microns that are held in highest regards are the 73u and 90u, as this is where the resin heads reside. These are sometimes isolated and sold as one of the highest quality, most expensive cannabis products in the market today, known as "full melt" because it will dab fine without having to be pressed. "Full spectrum" hash rosin will normally come from 45u-159u, as smaller and larger particles are likely to be too unrefined or broken stalks of the trichomes.

This hash is then pressed at the appropriate temperature and pressure to squeeze the oils out of the hash, and is collected with metal tools and parchment paper. Just like hydrocarbon extraction, the quality of the final product depends greatly on the quality of the starting material. This is emphasized even more so with hash rosin due to its lower yield percentages compared to solvent-derived concentrates (.3-8% rosin vs 10-20% hydrocarbon). Hash rosin producers often touch on how growing cannabis for hash production is different than growing for flower production, as some strains will be deceptive with their looks regarding yields.

Legality

In Canada, hash oil – defined as a chemically concentrated extract having up to 90% THC potency – was approved for commerce in October 2018.

In the United States, regulations specifically for hash oil have not been issued as of 2019, but hemp seed oil – along with hulled hemp seeds and hemp seed protein – were approved as generally recognized as safe (GRAS) in December 2018, indicating that "these products can be legally marketed in human foods for these uses without food additive approval, provided they comply with all other requirements and do not make disease treatment claims".

Ingredient in vape liquids

Adulterated products

Vitamin E acetate

On September 5, 2019, the United States Food and Drug Administration (US FDA) announced that 10 out of 18, or 56% of the samples of vape liquids sent in by states, linked to recent vaping related lung disease outbreak in the United States, tested positive for vitamin E acetate which had been used as a thickening agent by illicit THC vape cartridge manufacturers. On November 8, 2019, the Centers for Disease Control and Prevention (CDC) identified vitamin E acetate as a very strong culprit of concern in the vaping-related illnesses, but has not ruled out other chemicals or toxicants as possible causes. The CDC's findings were based on fluid samples from the lungs of 29 patients with vaping-associated pulmonary injury, which provided direct evidence of vitamin E acetate at the primary site of injury in all the 29 lung fluid samples tested. Research suggests when vitamin E acetate is inhaled, it may interfere with normal lung functioning. "Vitamin E oil might be in 60-70% of street carts, insiders say."

Synthetic cannabinoids
Counterfeit THC oil has been detected to contain synthetic cannabinoids. Several school kids in Greater Manchester collapsed after vaping Spice mis-sold as 'natural cannabis'.

Safety

Use

 the health effects of using hash oil were poorly documented. Cannabis extracts have less plant matter and create less harmful smoke. However, trace amounts of impurities are not generally regarded as safe (GRAS). In 2019 following an outbreak of illnesses additives added to vape pen mixtures were found to be causing breathing problems, lung damage, and deaths.

Production
Most of the solvents employed vaporize quickly and are flammable, making the extraction process dangerous. Several explosion and fire incidents related to hash oil manufacturing attempts in homes have been reported.

Solvents used to extract THC are flammable or combustible and have resulted in explosions, fires, severe injuries, and deaths.

Handling 

The LD50 for THC (Delta 9 Tetrahydrocannabinol) is not precisely known, as there have been no recorded fatalities. Hash oil can contain up to 80% THC, though up to 99% is possible with other methods of extraction. While health issues of the lungs may be exacerbated by use of hash oil, it is not known to cause side effects not already found in other preparations of cannabis.

Storage 
When exposed to air, warmth and light (especially without antioxidants), the oil loses its taste and psychoactivity due to aging. Cannabinoid carboxylic acids (THCA, CBDA, and maybe others) have an antibiotic effect on gram-positive bacteria such as (penicillin-resistant) Staphylococcus aureus, but gram-negative bacteria such as Escherichia coli are unaffected.

See also 

 Cannabis concentrate
Fragrance extraction
 Liquid smoke
 Live resin
 Oleoresin capsicum
 Rosin
 Tall oil
 Gas explosions

References

Further reading 
 Ed Rosenthal, Beyond Buds: Marijuana Extracts, 2014.

Chemical mixtures
Euphoriants
Preparations of cannabis
Resins
Oleoresin